Dwight Hall at Yale is a student-run, staff supported public service and social action organization at Yale University.  Founded in 1886, "The Hall" stands as one of the oldest and most storied collegiate public service institutions in the nation.  It is the largest student-run organization at Yale College.

Mission

Historical Origin

Dwight Hall was opened in 1886 as the campus chapter of YMCA as a part of the booming movement Muscular Christianity. The New Englander and Yale Review noted of the opening that "college athletics bear part of the praise of this growing manliness. The healthy play of young life in honorable tests of ability, condemns and banishes rudeness and lawlessness of behavior from common life."  Today, Dwight Hall is not religiously affiliated.

Governance

Dwight Hall is primarily governed by its Cabinet and Executive Committee.  The Cabinet is composed of leaders from each of the Hall's nearly 100 Member Groups and organizations.

Recent Activity

Since the arrival of Executive Director Peter Crumlish in the mid-2000s, Dwight Hall has sought to innovate and modernize in the field of collegiate public service.  The 2015 and 2016 Executive Committees have put a particular emphasis on expanding the Hall's presence on campus.  For example, the recently founded "Outreach Program" works to connect Dwight Hall to many different organizations and students at Yale, including those without a service affiliation.  The Hall has also made an active effort to expand its social justice advocacy efforts 
 and recently endorsed a candidate for the Yale College Council Presidency for the first time.

In 2016, the Yale Prison Education Initiative was founded as an institutional program of Dwight Hall. YPEI offers Yale liberal arts courses to incarcerated students in Connecticut. In 2021, YPEI announced a partnership with the University of New Haven in order to offer degrees to students in prison.

Member Groups

Dwight Hall serves as the umbrella organization for nearly 100 member groups that are divided into four networks.

Social Justice Network: 
Best Buddies
Black Solidarity Conference (BSC)
Black Student Alliance at Yale (BSAY)
Elmseed Enterprise Fund
Habitat for Humanity
Movimiento Estuiantil Chicano de Aztlán (MEChA)
Yale Animal Welfare Alliance
Yale Refugee Project
Yale Student Environmental Coalition (YSEC)
Yale Undergraduate Prison Project (YUPP) 
YHHAP: Yale Hunger and Homelessness Action Project

Education Network: 
Bridges
Camp Kesem
Community Health Educators (CHE)
DEMOS
Dive In
Global Brigades
Hear Your Song
Hemispheres
Instrumental Connection
MathCOUNTS
New Haven REACH
PALS
Ready Set Launch
Students for Autism Awareness at Yale (SAAY)
Summer Science Research Institute
Synapse
Teaching Peace Initiative
Ulysses S. Grant Foundation
Urban Debate League
Urban Improvement Corps
Yale Children's Theater

Public Health Network: 
AIDS Walk New Haven
American Red Cross at Yale
Colleges Against Cancer/Relay for Life
Hypertension Awareness and Prevention Program at Yale (HAPPY)
Living History Project
Public Health Coalition
Yale AIDS Support Coalition (YASC)
Yale Sight Savers
Yale Undergraduates at Connecticut Hospice (YUCH)

International Network: 
Building Bridges
Engineers Without Borders
REMEDY
Rotaract Club
Volunteers Around the World
Yale Undergraduate Association for African Peace and Development
Yale Undergraduate Students for UNICEF

References

Yale University
Organizations based in New Haven, Connecticut
Non-profit organizations based in Connecticut